Ganesh Kutum was an Asom Gana Parishad politician from Assam. He was the twelfth Speaker of the Assam Legislative Assembly from June 1996 to May 2001. He was elected in Assam Legislative Assembly election in 1985 and 1996 from Gohpur constituency.

References 

Living people
Asom Gana Parishad politicians
Assam MLAs 1985–1991
Assam MLAs 1996–2001
People from Sonitpur district
Speakers of the Assam Legislative Assembly
1948 births